KampfPanzer: Armored Combat, 1937–40 is a board wargame published by Simulations Publications Inc. (SPI) in 1973 that simulates the first battles involving battle tanks.

Background
Tanks as armored units capable of overcoming trench warfare were first used by British forces in World War I during the Battle of Cambrai in 1917. These early machines were slow, cumbersome and prone to mechanical breakdown in the middle of no man's land. In the 1930s, many nations developed the concept of the "battle tank", a relatively rapid, mobile, well-armed and well-armored machine, usually with an artillery gun in a rotating turret. These modern tanks and the beginnings of the tactics for both using them and defending against them made appearances in various conflicts in the late 1930s.

Description
KampfPanzer (German for "battle tank") is a two-player game that pits various combinations of tanks, infantry and artillery against each other during the first years of such combat.

Components
The original magazine pull-out version of the game includes:
22" x 34" unmounted paper hex grid map scaled at 100 m (110 yd) per hex, with generic terrain that can be adapted to all scenarios
10-page map-folded rules sheet
sheet of charts and scenarios
200 die-cut counters
simultaneous move sheet
The boxed edition of the game included a pad of double-sided simultaneous move sheets, and a small six-sided die.

Gameplay
Rather than the then-standard alternating "I Go, You Go" system of movement and combat found in most wargames of the time, Kampfpanzer uses SPI's first simultaneous turn system, "SiMov". Both players are required to write down the actions each unit will take for the coming turn. These moves and actions are then simultaneously revealed, and the turn occurs, representing the equivalent of 3 min 40 sec in game time. The game also has "panic" rules for units in combat; if a unit reaches a "panic" threshold, the unit moves in a random direction for a turn and does not fight.

Scenarios
The game included nine scenarios, eight of them historical, one of them hypothetical:
 Spain, 1937: Combat during the Spanish Civil War
 Czechoslovakia, 1938: A hypothetical encounter between a mechanized German unit and Czech defenders during the German occupation of Czechoslovakia
 Bain-Tsagan Hill, 28 May 1939: Encounter between Russian and Japanese forces during the Russo-Japanese War
 Poland, September 1939: Combat between German and Polish armor during the Invasion of Poland
 Summa, 16 December 1939: Encounter between Finnish infantry and artillery and Russian tanks
 Hannut, 13 May 1940: A clash of French and German armor during the German Blitzkrieg
 Flavion, 16 May 1940: Another French-German combat
 Arras, 21 May 1940: British and German armor combat
 Abbeville, 27 May 1940: Another encounter between British and German armor.

Publication history
KampfPanzer was designed by Jim Dunnigan, with graphic design by Redmond A. Simonsen, and appeared as a pull-out game in Issue No. 41 of SPI's house magazine Strategy & Tactics in 1973. SPI also released the game in a flatpack box.

The SiMov system was judged to be too cumbersome by critics and players, and SPI dropped the system immediately. The following year, Panzer '44, another tank battle game, used a blended system of alternating movement but simultaneous combat.

Reception
In a poll conducted by SPI in 1976 to determine the most popular wargames in North America, Kampfpanzer placed a very poor 136th out of 202 games.

In A Player's Guide to Table Games, John Jackson noted "A decent enough effort, Kampfpanzers biggest problem is that its scenarios and units seem inherently dull compared to the super weapons of the more 'modern' games."

In Issue 15 of Simulacrum, Joe Scoleri called the simultaneous movement system "cumbersome", and noted that the game system was quickly eclipsed by SPI's much superior Panzer '44 published the following year. 

In the 1977 book The Comprehensive Guide to Board Wargaming, Nicholas Palmer noted the "controversial panic rule which randomly makes some units disobey orders." He concluded that the game was "Generally simpler but less challenging than [Avalon Hill's] Panzer Leader, except for the simultaneity of movement." 

In Issue 65 of Fire & Movement, Jeff Petraska called it an "interesting game which is insightful and plays rather well. Its only system flaw is that there is no way for infantry to attack tanks. This is not as serious as it could be because during the time period portrayed in the game infantrymen were still figuring out how to do that."

Other reviews and commentary
Panzerfaust No. 74
JagdPanther No. 13
Games & Puzzles #58

References

Board wargames set in Modern history
Jim Dunnigan games
Simulations Publications games
Wargames introduced in 1973
World War II board wargames